McClelland is a surname. Notable people with the surname include:
 Alyssa McClelland, Australian actress
 Charles A. McClelland (1917–2006), American political systems analyst
 Charles P. McClelland (1854–1944), New York politician, and US federal judge
 David McClelland, American psychologist
 Doug McClelland, Australian politician
 George William McClelland, American educator
 Glenn McClelland, American keyboardist
 Helen Grace McClelland (1887–1984), United States Army nurse
 Hugh McClelland (politician) (1875–1958), Australian politician
 James McClelland (disambiguation), several people
 Jim McClelland, Australian senator and judge
 John McClelland (disambiguation), several people
 Mac McClelland, journalist
 Mark McClelland, bassist for Little Doses, previously for Snow Patrol
 Matthew McClelland, (1832-1883), Medal of Honor recipient
 Nina McClelland (1929–2020), American chemist
 Robert McClelland (disambiguation), several people
 Thomas McClelland, U.S. Naval Captain
 Tim McClelland, Major League Baseball umpire

See also 
 Clelland, a related surname
 McLelland
 McClelland's Single Malt Scotch whisky
 McClelland, Iowa, a small city in the United States
 McClellan (disambiguation)

Scottish surnames
Anglicised Scottish Gaelic-language surnames
Surnames of Ulster-Scottish origin